The 1960 La Flèche Wallonne was the 24th edition of La Flèche Wallonne cycle race and was held on 9 May 1960. The race started in Liège and finished in Charleroi. The race was won by Pino Cerami of the Peugeot team.

General classification

References

1960 in road cycling
1960
1960 in Belgian sport